AFCEC may refer to:
 Air Force Civil Engineer Center, a field operating agency of the US Air Force Civil Engineer
 Alberta Farmers' Co-operative Elevator Company, a cooperative that ran grain elevators between 1913 and 1917